Thoothoor is a coastal town located in the southern district of Tamil Nadu, called Kanyakumari bordering the state of Kerala in India.

Etymology
The name Thoothoor has its roots in the Tamil words தூ/தூய்மை (Cleanliness/immaculateness) and ஊர் (town/place) meaning a "Clean place". The region was filled with white sands everywhere and people used to live in a very small area, so most of the region was vacant and covered with white sands. Hence the name.

History
The Catholic Church plays a conspicuous role in the day-to-day life of the fishermen of Thoothoor village. The conversion of the fishermen of this village to Christianity may be traced back to A.D. 1544. The event cumulated in the works of St. Francis Xavier, who is said to have converted 10,000 Mukkuva fishermen living in thirteen villages along the coast (from Pallam to Poovar—Neerody, Marthandanthurai,Vallavilai, Eraviputhenthurai, Thoothoor, Poothurai, Thengapattanam, Enayam, Midalam, Vaniyakudy, Colachel, Kadiapattanam, Muttom and Pallam) in December 1544.

In 1600, the Thoothoor Parish Church was brought under the Padroado. Subsequently, this Parish came under the Diocese of Cochin. In 1838, St. Thomas Church, Thoothoor and other adjacent coastal Churches from Pallithura to Erayumanthurai were brought under the Diocese of Varapuzha. This unification brought the Padroado–Propaganda dispute to a crucial stage. Ultimately St. Thomas Church, Thoothoor was brought under the Diocese of Cochin with its revival in 1850.

The Diocese of Thiruvananthapuram was founded on 1 July 1937[1]. But only in 1952 were all the coastal Churches from Pallithura to Erayumanthurai added to the Roman Catholic Archdiocese of Trivandrum or Thiruvananthapuram Diocese. Thu,s at present Thoothoor Parish Church is one of the Foranate Churches of Trivandrum Diocese.

Geography
Thoothoor is a coastal village is situated on the Arabian Sea coast. It is the headquarters of Thoothoor panchayat, consisting of five villages, namely Thoothoor, Chinnathurai, Eraviputhenthurai, Poothurai and Erayumanthurai. These five villages together are commonly just called Thoothooor. Thoothoor is geographically located in killiyoor Taluk, Kanyakumari District, Tamil Nadu India. It is located 45 km west of Nagercoil, the headquarters of Kanyakumari District and 40 km southeast of Thiruvananthapuram, the capital of Kerala State. Thiruvananthapuram Airport is the nearest airport and the railway station is at Parassala or Kuzhithurai.

Thoothoor is almost exclusively a fishing village, even though a little group of people are involved in agriculture, especially in coconut plantations, besides their primary occupation in other professions. The fishing operation in this village is most often restricted to a coastline the length of one-kilometer. Its total population is about 6,000. This village is bounded in the north by the Paalamadam, south by the Arabian Sea, east by Poothurai village and west by Chinnathurai village.

Demographics

Economy

As of 2007, Thoothoor is the home of several significant economic sources. The main business is Shark catching, using modern equipments such as GPS and other Navigation tools. The average cost of one fishing boat is 30–60 lakhs in Indian currency. Fishermen usually go fishing in the Arabian Sea, the Bay of Bengal and the Indian Ocean. Boat owners travel in and around Tamil Nadu state and neighboring states such as Kerala, and the more distant state of Maharashtra. Now a few boat owners have moved to the Andaman & Nicobar Islands for deep sea fishing. The sweat of our boat owners and fishermen working with them make wonders to their generation. Fisherman support their families by fishing and hence their families are able to afford higher education. Thus, just like modern cities most of the kids are getting higher education in a good atmosphere with a tremendous amount of good energy. The positive energy flows and flourishes in success's path on each and every Thoothoor native. The children should be very proud to have had such hard working ancestors and parents. The main road allows money to be exchanged from the shark business and shark merchandise, as well as some other fish on a small level. In terms of jobs, in Thoothoor there are a few main sectors, a large number of people from this place are working in their respective industries such as IT, manufacturing, education, educational management, the medical field, business management, mechanical engineering, marine engineering, electrical engineering, lawyers, etc. All such people are trained professionals, graduates, and a few PhD holders in mathematics, history, Tamil and physics. There are masters in IT professional, fish merchandise, teachers in education sectors and a few health services. A few hundred people are working in the Persian Gulf in countries such as UAE, Qatar, Saudi Arabia, etc. A fewer number of people working are in the UK, the US, Canada and New Zealand. The mechanical engineers and marine engineers work on international and local ships. Some MBAs are working at south Indian bank. Some marine engineers work in international ships in the deep sea. They travel to various countries. There are a few hundred natives of Thoothoor working in Chennai, Bangalore, Mumbai, Delhi, and Thiruvananthapuram. The few people working locally work in small businesses and agriculture.

Agriculture resources are:

Transportation
Government buses
Taxi
Auto rickshaws
Private buses for traveling to distant cities such as Chennai, Madurai and Bangalore
The nearest train station is in Kuzhithurai, 10 km away
Thiruvananthapuram international airport is about 40 km

Education
Education plays a vital role in Thoothoor. The Government Primary School provides education to the poor. The private schools include:

St.Jude's College, Thoothoor It is affiliated with Manonmaniam Sundaranar University, Tirunelveli.
Pius XI Higher Secondary School, Thoothoor 
Infant Jesus Matriculation School, managed by St. Jude's College
Canossa Pre – Primary School, managed by Canossa Convent, now this school is managed by St. Judes College 
Navajeevan English Medium school, Nithiravilai
St.Johns matriculation school,Thoothoor, manged by St.Johns the Baptist sisters of Thoothoor covent.

The above said educational institutions are providing educational service for the educational uplift of this village and neighbouring villages and towns.

Sports
The main sports of the region being football, the passion for football in thoothoor spans several decades, but Thoothoor had very little to show for it in terms of churning out professional footballers until recent times.

In 2012, a team representing Kanyakumari district with 13 of its 16 members from Thoothoor lifted the inaugural Chief Minister's Trophy bringing home a whopping `1 lakh per player.

Thoothoor Forane Football Academy is the only academy to be established in the region and is set to begin functioning on September 27. TFFA will train 40 young Thoothoor footballers in the U-14 and U-16 categories.

Three from Thoothoor — Reagan Albarnas, A Jacksan Dhas and S Shinu — were part of the Tamil Nadu Santosh Trophy squad.
and Around 20 footballers from the region have gone on to play for department sides like  Indian Railways, ICF - Chennai, Chennai Nethaji Club, Indian Bank and Mumbai Hindustan Limited.

	NLT (Netaji Library & Sports Club Thoothoor) was started in the year 1957. NLT which started its journey as a simple newspaper reading room has evolved as a giant organisation today with district level reputation as a library and multinational recognition as a sports club particularly football.

	NLT conducts the popular " One day Football tournament " every year on Easter Sunday, with a prize money of 100,000 INR and thousands of  people attending. The game is conducted in group stage and playoffs. As a result, NLT is recognised as a symbol of pride for people in Thoothoor region.

Religion
The territory is a Catholic Christian community. This Region was converted to Christianity during Saint Thomas the Apostle Period. Thoothoor Forane  church was built by the Dutch in about 1600 and renovated on 2010. Thoothoor Forane contains 8 Parishes

See also
 Thomas the Apostle
 Saint Francis Xavier
 Roman Catholic Church
 Kanyakumari

References
http://www.thoothoor.com/thr/doc_history.asp

External links
http://www.thoothoor.com

Villages in Kanyakumari district